Monsore is an album by British Afro rock band Osibisa released in 1997 by Red Steel Music/Flying Elephant. A version was licensed to AIM for the Australian market. Their particular sound incorporated new world-fusion elements on this studio recording. The album was recorded in London in 1995 thru 1996.

Track listing

Personnel
Teddy Osei: saxophone, vocals, flute, drums, lead and backing vocals
Kari Bannerman, Roger Bebou, Winston Delandro, Smart Inkansah: guitars
Jean-Karl Dikoto Mandengue, Herman Asafo-Adyei, Michael Bailey: bass guitars
Kofi Ayivor, Gaspar Lawal, Joe Osei, Dinesh Pandit, Daku Potato, Amadu Saho: drums
Raimi Rasheed: trombone
Kenny Wellington, Claude Deppa: trumpets
Errol Reid, Bessa Simon: keyboards
Bosie: African xylophone
Greg Brown: vocals
T-Bone, Kathy, Pam, Sherry: backing vocals

Credits
Recorded at Monroe Studios, London, England in 1995
Producer, arranger, mixing: Teddy Osei and Robert M Corich
Engineer, remixing: Roger Benou
Executive producer: Robert M. Corich
Art direction: Frank McPartland

References
Track listing and writing information from Osibisa's official website 
Published by Osibisounds Ltd, under license by Red Steel Music Ltd. and ℗ 1997 AIM Records & Tapes Pty Ltd., Byron Bay, Australia
Red Steel catalog #RMC-CD 9203
AIM catalog #1065-CD
Progarchives - 
Artist Direct  

1997 albums
Osibisa albums